1st Cavalry, 1st Cavalry Division, 1st Cavalry Brigade, 1st Cavalry Regiment or 1st Cavalry Battalion may refer to:

Armies
 1st Cavalry Army, Soviet Union

Corps
 I Cavalry Corps (Grande Armée)
 I Cavalry Corps (German Empire)
 1st Cavalry Corps (Russian Empire)

Divisions
 1st Cavalry Division (Australia)
 1st Cavalry Division (Belgium)
 1st Light Cavalry Division (France)
 1st Foot Cavalry Division (France)
 1st Cavalry Division (German Empire)
 1st Cavalry Division (Reichswehr), Germany
 1st Cavalry Division (Wehrmacht), Germany
 1st Cossack Cavalry Division, a unit of the Wehrmacht, Germany
 1st Indian Cavalry Division
 1st Cavalry Division Eugenio di Savoia, a unit of the Royal Italian Army
 1st Cavalry Division (Poland)
 1st Cavalry Division (Russian Empire)
 1st Guards Cavalry Division (Russian Empire)
 1st Cavalry Division (Soviet Union)
 1st Mountain Cavalry Division (Soviet Union)
 1st Cavalry Division (United Kingdom)
 1st Cavalry Division (United States)
 1st Cavalry Division (Kingdom of Yugoslavia)

Brigades
 1st Cavalry Brigade (Australia)
 1st Mechanized Cavalry Brigade, Brazil
 1st Cavalry Brigade (France)
 1st Cavalry Brigade (Hungary)
 1st (Risalpur) Cavalry Brigade, a unit of the Indian Army
 1st Cavalry Brigade (Imperial Japanese Army)
 1st Cavalry Brigade (Poland)
 1st Cavalry Brigade (United Kingdom)
 1st Cavalry Brigade (United States)
 1st Air Cavalry Brigade, 1st Cavalry Division (United States)

Regiments and battalions

France
 1st Foreign Cavalry Regiment, a unit of the French Foreign Legion
 1st Polish Light Cavalry Regiment of the Imperial Guard, a unit of Napoleonic France
 1st Spahi Regiment
 1st Parachute Hussar Regiment

Germany
 1st Royal Bavarian Heavy Cavalry (Prince Charles of Bavaria's)
 1st Royal Bavarian Chevau-légers "Emperor Nicholas of Russia"
 1st Royal Bavarian Uhlans "Emperor William II, King of Prussia"
 1st Royal Saxon Guards Heavy Cavalry
 1st King's Mounted Rifles
 1st (Silesian) Life Cuirassiers "Great Elector"
 1st Guards Uhlans

United States
 1st Cavalry Regiment (United States)
 1st Cavalry Regiment (1855)
 1st United States Volunteer Cavalry

Union Army (American Civil War)
 1st Regiment Alabama Cavalry (Union)
 1st Regiment Arkansas Cavalry (Union)
 1st California Cavalry Regiment
 1st California Cavalry Battalion
 1st Colorado Cavalry Regiment
 1st Connecticut Cavalry Regiment
 1st Dakota Cavalry Battalion
 1st Florida Cavalry Regiment (Union)
 1st Illinois Cavalry Regiment
 1st Iowa Volunteer Cavalry Regiment
 1st Louisiana Cavalry Regiment (Union)
 1st Maine Volunteer Cavalry Regiment
 1st Regiment Maryland Volunteer Cavalry
 1st Maryland Cavalry (Union)
 1st Michigan Volunteer Cavalry Regiment
 1st Minnesota Volunteer Cavalry Regiment
 1st Regiment Nebraska Volunteer Cavalry
 1st New Jersey Volunteer Cavalry
 1st Ohio Cavalry
 1st Oregon Volunteer Cavalry Regiment
 1st Pennsylvania Cavalry Regiment
 1st Rhode Island Cavalry
 1st Texas Cavalry Regiment (Union)
 1st Vermont Cavalry
 1st West Virginia Volunteer Cavalry Regiment
 1st Wisconsin Volunteer Cavalry Regiment

Confederate Army (American Civil War)
 1st Regiment Alabama Volunteer Cavalry (Confederate)
 1st Arkansas Cavalry Regiment (Crawford's)
 1st Arkansas Cavalry Regiment (Dobbin's)
 1st Arkansas Cavalry Regiment (Monroe's)
 1st Cavalry Regiment, Arkansas State Troops
 1st Florida Cavalry
 1st Florida Special Cavalry Battalion
 1st Georgia Cavalry
 1st Battalion, Georgia Cavalry
 1st Louisiana Cavalry Regiment
 1st North Carolina Cavalry Regiment
 1st Virginia Cavalry

Others
 1st Cavalry Regiment (Chile)